Robert Harworth or Fuyster (fl. 1388–1401), of Lincoln, was an English wool merchant, mayor and Member of Parliament.

He was Mayor of Lincoln for 1393–94 and a Member (MP) of the Parliament of England for Lincoln in 1388, 1395 and 1401.

References

14th-century births
15th-century deaths
English MPs September 1388
English MPs 1395
Members of the Parliament of England (pre-1707) for Lincoln
Mayors of Lincoln, England
English MPs 1401